Pavel Borisovich Luspekayev (20 April 1927, Luhansk —  17 April 1970, Moscow) was a Soviet actor who is best known for his role of Vereschagin in the classic Russian movie White Sun of the Desert. Laureate of the State Prize of the Russian Federation (1997, posthumously).

Biography 

Pavel Luspekayev was born in Luhansk, Ukrainian SSR in 1927. His father Bogdasar Luspekyan was an Armenian butcher from a village near Nakhichevan-on-Don (Russian city founded by Armenian settlers). His mother Seraphima Kovaleva came from Don Cossacks. During the Great Patriotic War he joined the Soviet partisans at the age of 16 and fought shortly after with the 3rd Ukrainian Front. When his feet suffered severe frostbite, he had to be demobilised in 1944. Luspekayev's lower limbs never fully recovered.
 
In 1945 Luspekayev became student in the Mikhail Shchepkin Higher Theatre School in Moscow. After finishing the school in 1950 he performed in Tbilisi's Griboedov Russian Drama Theatre, in 1956 in Kiev's Lesya Ukrainka National Academic Theater of Russian Drama. In 1959 he joined Leningrad's Bolshoi Drama Theatre where he performed in plays under director Georgy Tovstonogov. In 1965 Luspekayev was awarded the title of Meritorious Artist (Zasluzhenny aktyor) of RSFSR.

The long-term effects of the suffered frostbite caused a peripheral vascular disease in Luspekayev's legs when he was 26. The illness progressed, and after he finished the movie The Republic of ShKID (1966) both of his legs had to be amputated just below the knees.

Nevertheless, he continued to perform on prosthesis, even though he was suffering from pain. During filming of White Sun of the Desert in 1969, Luspekayev's condition worsened, and he could barely walk. His wife was carrying a small folding chair, and Luspekayev had to take a rest every 20 steps. In the original script, the role of Vereschagin was a minor one, but during filming, the role began to expand, with some of the scenes being improvised on the spot. The connection between the actor and the role he was playing became so strong, that the crew began to call Vereschagin by name Pavel (Pasha), even though in the script his name was Alexander.

Shortly after the White Sun of the Desert was released, Pavel Luspekayev died from a heart aneurysm. He was buried in the Northern Cemetery of Saint Petersburg.

Personal life
He was married to a BDT actress Inna Kirillova. They had one daughter and two grandchildren.

Filmography

References

External links

 Pavel Luspekayev bio
 Vladimir Motyl's memoirs about Pavel Luspekayev

1927 births
1970 deaths
Soviet Armenians
Soviet male actors
Soviet amputees
Ethnic Armenian male actors
Soviet partisans
Don Cossacks
People from Luhansk
State Prize of the Russian Federation laureates
Honored Artists of the RSFSR
Ukrainian anti-fascists